The NFL Top 100 Players of 2011 was the first season of the series. It ended with reigning NFL MVP Tom Brady being ranked #1, while Super Bowl MVP Aaron Rodgers was ranked #11.

Episode list

The list

References 

National Football League trophies and awards
National Football League records and achievements
National Football League lists